is a Quasi-National Park in Fukuoka Prefecture, Kumamoto Prefecture, and Ōita Prefecture, Japan.

See also

 Aonodōmon
 List of national parks of Japan

References

National parks of Japan
Parks and gardens in Fukuoka Prefecture
Parks and gardens in Kumamoto Prefecture
Parks and gardens in Ōita Prefecture
Protected areas established in 1950
1950 establishments in Japan